The Andhra movement or Andhrodyamam was a campaign for recognition of Telugu-speaking part of the Madras Presidency as a separate political unit in British India. The Andhra movement leaders alleged that the Telugu people were being suppressed by the Tamils, who dominated politics and government jobs. A similar movement was started by the Telangana people living in the Hyderabad State under Nizam's rule. It achieved success by the formation of Andhra state in 1953.

See also
 Visalandhra movement
Samaikyandhra Movement
Telangana Movement
Jai Andhra Movement

References

History of Andhra Pradesh
Regionalism in India